Frederick Walter Cogman  AKC was Dean of Guernsey from 1967 to 1978 
 
He was born on 4 March 1913, educated at Rutlish Grammar School and King's College London, and ordained in 1938. After a curacy at Upton-cum-Chalvey he became  Chaplain and Housemaster of St George's School, Harpenden. He was Rector of St Martin, Guernsey from 1948  to  1976; and of St Peter Port  from then until 1978.

He died on 23 July 2005.

References

1913 births
People educated at Rutlish School
Alumni of King's College London
Associates of King's College London
Guernsey Anglicans
Church of England deans
Deans of Guernsey
2005 deaths